Charles Julian Humphrey Mitchell, FRSL (born 1 May 1935) is an English playwright, screenwriter and occasional novelist. He is best known as the writer of the play and film Another Country, and as a screenwriter for TV, producing many original plays and series episodes, including at least ten for Inspector Morse.

Mitchell was born in Epping, Essex, and educated at Winchester College, where he won the English Verse and Duncan Reading Prizes. He did his national service in submarines 1953-55 as a Sub Lt RNVR. He then went to Wadham College, Oxford and received a BA with first class honours in 1958.  This was followed by a period as a Harkness Fellow in the USA (1959–61). He earned an M.A. in 1962 at St. Antony's College, Oxford. Since 1962 he has been a freelance writer.

In the late 1960s, Mitchell co-wrote the teleplay Arthur (Or the Decline and Fall of the British Empire) with Ray Davies of The Kinks. It was never produced, though it gave rise to the band's concept album. He recently recalled the aborted project: "Arthur had a most unhappy history. It was originally meant to be a ... sort of rock opera, and we got as far as casting (excellent director and actors) and finding locations and were about to go when the producer went to a production meeting without a proper budget, tried to flannel his way through it, was immediately sussed and the production pulled. I have never been able to forgive the man."

Mitchell has written nine produced plays, including Another Country, which won the SWET (now Olivier) Award for best play of the year (1981), and After Aida (1985), a play-with-music about composer Giuseppe Verdi.

Mitchell has screenplay credits for five feature films. The earliest was Arabesque (1966), which was directed by Stanley Donen. Another Country (1984) is based on Mitchell's own play, and directed by Marek Kanievska. Vincent & Theo (1990) is a biographical film about the famed painter Vincent van Gogh and his brother Theo, and was directed by Robert Altman. August (1996) was directed and starred Anthony Hopkins, and was adapted from Anton Chekhov's classic play Uncle Vanya. Wilde (1997) is based on the life of Oscar Wilde, and was directed by Brian Gilbert.

In 2007 he wrote the BBC4 drama Consenting Adults about Sir John Wolfenden and his celebrated 1957 report.

Novels 

Imaginary Toys (1961)
A Disturbing Influence (1962)
As Far as You Can Go (1963)
The White Father (1964) (winner of the Somerset Maugham Award)
A Circle of Friends (1966)
The Undiscovered Country (1968)

References

External links

 
 

1935 births
Living people
Alumni of St Antony's College, Oxford
English dramatists and playwrights
English television writers
English screenwriters
English male screenwriters
John Llewellyn Rhys Prize winners
Fellows of the Royal Society of Literature
People educated at Winchester College
People from Epping
Harkness Fellows
English male dramatists and playwrights
British male television writers